The 1986 Copa de la Liga was the fourth and last edition of Copa de la Liga. The competition started on May 1, 1986 and concluded on June 14, 1986. Due to time constraints, saturation and club pressure, the Copa de la Liga only lasted four years since 1982, being cancelled in 1986.

Format
The Copa de la Liga was played by 18 teams of 1985-86 La Liga and 4 winners of 1985 Copa de la Liga of Segunda División,  Segunda División B and Tercera División. All rounds are played over two legs. The team that has the higher aggregate score over the two legs progresses to the next round.

La Liga

Other teams
Real Oviedo, winner of 1985 Copa de la Liga of Segunda División.
Sestao Sport Club, winner of 1985 Copa de la Liga of Segunda División B group I.
Albacete Balompié, winner of 1985 Copa de la Liga of Segunda División B group II.
UB Conquense, winner of 1985 Copa de la Liga of Tercera División.

First round
First leg: 1 and 4 May 1986. Second leg: 8 and 9 May 1986.

|}
Bye: Atlético Madrid, FC Barcelona, Real Madrid and Sevilla FC.

Second round
First leg: 11 and 14 May 1986. Second leg: 18 and 21 May 1986.

|}
Bye: Real Betis, Real Zaragoza and Sporting Gijon.

Quarter-finals
First leg: 24 and 25 May 1986. Second leg: 29 May 1986.

|}

Semi-finals
First leg: 4 June 1986. Second leg: 8 June 1986.

|}

Final

First leg

Second leg

References

External links
RSSSF

Copa de la Liga
1985–86 in Spanish football cups